Pentolinium is a ganglionic blocking agent which acts as a nicotinic acetylcholine receptor antagonist. Formulated as the pentolinium tartrate salt, it is also known as Ansolysen. It can be used as an antihypertensive drug during surgery or to control hypertensive crises. It works by binding to the acetylcholine receptor of adrenergic nerves and thereby inhibiting the release of noradrenaline and adrenaline. Blocking this receptor leads to smooth muscle relaxation and vasodilation.

Route of administration and dose 
Pentolinium can be given orally (20mg three times a day), injected intramuscularly, or administered intravenously.

Use
Pentolinium and hexamethonium combined with Rauvolfia was reported in 1955 to be effective in the outpatient management of moderate to severe hypertension, with satisfactory orthostatic reduction in blood pressure but there are significant untoward effects attributable to the use of the hexamethonium. Pentolinium has been reported to offer more prolonged ganglionic blockade and has less severe untoward effects than hexamethonium.

References

External links 
 DrugBank: Pentolinium

Antihypertensive agents
Nicotinic antagonists
Pyrrolidines
Quaternary ammonium compounds